John Monck may refer to:

 John Monck (courtier) (1883–1964), British Marshal of the Diplomatic Corps 
 John Monck (cricketer) (1845–1929), New Zealand cricketer
 John Monck (film producer) (1908–1999), British film executive, known also as John Goldman
 John Monck (politician) (1769–1834), British Member of Parliament for Reading
 John Stanley Monck, Church of Ireland priest